Lycus is the name of multiple people in Greek mythology:

Lycus, one of the Telchines who fought under Dionysus in his Indian campaign. He is otherwise said to have erected a temple to Apollo Lycius on the banks of Xanthus river.
Lycus, son of Prometheus and Celaeno, brother of Chimaerus. The brothers are said to have had tombs in the Troad; they are otherwise unknown.
Lycus of Athens, a wolf-shaped herο, whose shrine stood by the jurycourt, and the first jurors were named after him. 
Lycus, an Egyptian prince as one of the sons of King Aegyptus. He suffered the same fate as his other brothers, save Lynceus of Argos, when they were slain on their wedding night by their wives who obeyed the command of their father King Danaus of Libya. Lycus was the son of Aegyptus by Argyphia, a woman of royal blood and thus full brother of Lynceus, Proteus, Enceladus, Busiris and Daiphron. In some accounts, he could be a son of Aegyptus either by Eurryroe, daughter of the river-god Nilus, or Isaie, daughter of King Agenor of Tyre. Lycus married the Danaid Agave, daughter of Danaus and Europe.
Lycus, son of Poseidon and Celaeno.
Lycus, the "loudvoiced" satyr herald of Dionysus during the Indian War. In secret union, Hermes fathered him, Pherespondus and Pronomus, by Iphthime, daughter of Dorus. Eiraphiotes (i.e. Dionysus) entrusted to these three satyr brothers the dignity of 'the staff of their wisdom-fostering father, the herald of heaven'.
Lycus, son of Arrhetus and Laobie, who, together with his father and brothers, fought under Deriades against Dionysus.
Lycus, son of Pandion II and brother of King Aegeus of Athens.
Lycus, son of Hyrieus and Clonia, and brother of Nycteus. He became the guardian of Labdacus and Laius. Nycteus, unable to retrieve his daughter Antiope from Epopeus of Sicyon, sent his brother Lycus to take her. He invaded Sicyon, killed Epopeus and gave Antiope as a slave to his own wife, Dirce.
Lycus, a descendant of the above Lycus, said to have usurped the power over Thebes.
 Lycus, son of Dascylus of Mysia or Mariandyne. He was hospitable towards the Argonauts and Heracles, who conquered the land of the Bebryces (Heraclea Pontica). He is apparently identical with the Lycus given as a son of Titias, brother of Priolaus and eponym of a city.
 Lycus, same as Lycurgus (of Nemea).
 Lycus, the mortal lover of Coronis, mother of Asclepius. He is otherwise commonly known as Ischys, son of Elatus.
Lycus, a Thracian killed by Cycnus in single combat.
 Lycus, a centaur at the wedding of Pirithous and Hippodamia, was killed by Pirithous.
 Lycus, a defender of Thebes in the war of the Seven against Thebes.
Lycus and Pernis are listed by Hyginus as parents of Ascalaphus and Ialmenus, who are otherwise known as sons of Ares and Astyoche.
Lycus, son of Ares and a Libyan king.
Lycus, a Cretan princes as the son of King Idomeneus and Meda, probably the brother of Orsilochus, Cleisithyra and Iphiclus. Together with the latter, they were slain by the usurper Leucus.
Lycus, one of the companions of Diomedes that were changed into birds in Italy
 Lycus, a lost companion of Aeneas
 Lycus, another companion of Aeneas, killed by Turnus.
 Lycus and Termerus were two notorious brigands in Caria.

Notes

References 

 Apollodorus, The Library with an English Translation by Sir James George Frazer, F.B.A., F.R.S. in 2 Volumes, Cambridge, MA, Harvard University Press; London, William Heinemann Ltd. 1921. ISBN 0-674-99135-4. Online version at the Perseus Digital Library. Greek text available from the same website.
Apollonius Rhodius, Argonautica translated by Robert Cooper Seaton (1853-1915), R. C. Loeb Classical Library Volume 001. London, William Heinemann Ltd, 1912. Online version at the Topos Text Project.
 Apollonius Rhodius, Argonautica. George W. Mooney. London. Longmans, Green. 1912. Greek text available at the Perseus Digital Library.
 Diodorus Siculus, The Library of History translated by Charles Henry Oldfather. Twelve volumes. Loeb Classical Library. Cambridge, Massachusetts: Harvard University Press; London: William Heinemann, Ltd. 1989. Vol. 3. Books 4.59–8. Online version at Bill Thayer's Web Site
 Diodorus Siculus, Bibliotheca Historica. Vol 1-2. Immanel Bekker. Ludwig Dindorf. Friedrich Vogel. in aedibus B. G. Teubneri. Leipzig. 1888-1890. Greek text available at the Perseus Digital Library.
 Euripides, The Complete Greek Drama edited by Whitney J. Oates and Eugene O'Neill, Jr. in two volumes. 1. Heracles, translated by E. P. Coleridge. New York. Random House. 1938. Online version at the Perseus Digital Library.
 Euripides, Euripidis Fabulae. vol. 2. Gilbert Murray. Oxford. Clarendon Press, Oxford. 1913. Greek text available at the Perseus Digital Library.
 Gaius Julius Hyginus, Fabulae from The Myths of Hyginus translated and edited by Mary Grant. University of Kansas Publications in Humanistic Studies. Online version at the Topos Text Project.
 Herodotus, The Histories with an English translation by A. D. Godley. Cambridge. Harvard University Press. 1920. Online version at the Topos Text Project. Greek text available at Perseus Digital Library.
 Lucius Mestrius Plutarchus, Moralia with an English Translation by Frank Cole Babbitt. Cambridge, MA. Harvard University Press. London. William Heinemann Ltd. 1936. Online version at the Perseus Digital Library. Greek text available from the same website.
 Nonnus of Panopolis, Dionysiaca translated by William Henry Denham Rouse (1863-1950), from the Loeb Classical Library, Cambridge, MA, Harvard University Press, 1940.  Online version at the Topos Text Project.
 Nonnus of Panopolis, Dionysiaca. 3 Vols. W.H.D. Rouse. Cambridge, MA., Harvard University Press; London, William Heinemann, Ltd. 1940-1942. Greek text available at the Perseus Digital Library.
 Pausanias, Description of Greece with an English Translation by W.H.S. Jones, Litt.D., and H.A. Ormerod, M.A., in 4 Volumes. Cambridge, MA, Harvard University Press; London, William Heinemann Ltd. 1918. . Online version at the Perseus Digital Library
Pausanias, Graeciae Descriptio. 3 vols. Leipzig, Teubner. 1903.  Greek text available at the Perseus Digital Library.
 Publius Ovidius Naso, Metamorphoses translated by Brookes More (1859-1942). Boston, Cornhill Publishing Co. 1922. Online version at the Perseus Digital Library.
 Publius Ovidius Naso, Metamorphoses. Hugo Magnus. Gotha (Germany). Friedr. Andr. Perthes. 1892. Latin text available at the Perseus Digital Library.
 Publius Papinius Statius, The Thebaid translated by John Henry Mozley. Loeb Classical Library Volumes. Cambridge, MA, Harvard University Press; London, William Heinemann Ltd. 1928. Online version at the Topos Text Project.
 Publius Papinius Statius, The Thebaid. Vol I-II. John Henry Mozley. London: William Heinemann; New York: G.P. Putnam's Sons. 1928. Latin text available at the Perseus Digital Library.
 Publius Vergilius Maro, Aeneid. Theodore C. Williams. trans. Boston. Houghton Mifflin Co. 1910. Online version at the Perseus Digital Library.
 Publius Vergilius Maro, Bucolics, Aeneid, and Georgics. J. B. Greenough. Boston. Ginn & Co. 1900. Latin text available at the Perseus Digital Library.
 Strabo, The Geography of Strabo. Edition by H.L. Jones. Cambridge, Mass.: Harvard University Press; London: William Heinemann, Ltd. 1924. Online version at the Perseus Digital Library.
 Strabo, Geographica edited by A. Meineke. Leipzig: Teubner. 1877. Greek text available at the Perseus Digital Library.

Kings in Greek mythology
Sons of Aegyptus
Characters in the Aeneid
Anatolian characters in Greek mythology
Egyptian characters in Greek mythology
Thracian characters in Greek mythology
Metamorphoses into birds in Greek mythology